The 1926 U.S. Open was the 30th U.S. Open, held July 8–10 at Scioto Country Club in Columbus, Ohio. Noted amateur Bobby Jones, winner of the British Open two weeks earlier, won the second of his four U.S. Opens, one stroke ahead of runner-up Joe Turnesa.

After rounds of 70-79-71, Jones was three strokes behind third round leader Turnesa, who unraveled on the last nine on Saturday afternoon, with five bogeys in six holes. He managed to birdie the final hole for a 77 and 294 total for solo second (and the winner's share of the purse). Jones got off to a slow start, with bogeys at three of his first five holes, then birdied the 7th and ran off a streak of nine consecutive fours. Needing a par on the par-5 18th to tie (and force a playoff round), Jones hit a  tee shot, then followed with an approach to the green, leaving  for eagle. Two-putting for birdie, Jones carded a one-over 73 to best Turnesa by a stroke. Bill Mehlhorn opened with 68 on Thursday,  and led after both of the first two rounds, but was ten over par on Saturday and was four strokes back, in a four-way tie for third.

Jones became the first player to win the U.S. Open and British Open in the same year, and he won both again four years later in 1930, during his grand slam year. Later double Open winners were Gene Sarazen (1932), Ben Hogan (1953), Lee Trevino (1971), Tom Watson (1982), and Tiger Woods (2000). While Turnesa never won a major, he did finish second twice and his brother Jim won the PGA Championship in 1952. Another brother, Willie, won the U.S. Amateur twice and the British Amateur once. In total, eight Turnesa brothers played on the PGA Tour.

This was also the first year since 1919 that the tournament was extended to three days, because of the number of entries and the size of the gallery. The first two rounds were now played over two days, Thursday and Friday, with a 36-hole cut. The final two rounds continued to be played on one day, Saturday. This format continued through 1964, except for the following year in 1927, when it was held Tuesday through Thursday (with a Friday playoff). The final round in 1959 was on Sunday due to weather delays.

Scioto was only ten years old at the time, and its club pro was George Sargent, the 1909 champion, who did not compete. It later hosted the Ryder Cup in 1931 and the PGA Championship in 1950. Scioto is also noteworthy as the club where Jack Nicklaus learned to play as a youth in the 1950s, under the tutelage of Jack Grout.

Past champions in the field

Made the cut 

Source:

Missed the cut 

Source:

Round summaries

First round
Thursday, July 8, 1926

Source:

Second round
Friday, July 9, 1926

Source:

Third round
Saturday, July 10, 1926 (morning)

Source:

Final round
Saturday, July 10, 1926 (afternoon)

Source:

Amateurs: Jones (+5), Evans (+14), Johnston (+21), MacDonald (+22), Shute (+28), Westland (+28).

Scorecard
Final round

Cumulative tournament scores, relative to par

Source:

References

External links
USGA Championship Database
USOpen.com - 1926

U.S. Open (golf)
Golf in Ohio
Sports competitions in Columbus, Ohio
U.S. Open
U.S. Open
U.S. Open
Sports competitions in Ohio
July 1926 sports events